The Glenoe dialect is an Ulster Scots dialect spoken in the Glenoe district in East Antrim, Northern Ireland.

Phonology

Consonants

Before ,  also becomes interdental, as in   'halter'. As these allophones are fully predictable, the diacritic is omitted elsewhere in the article.
  are phonetically alveolo-palatal sibilants articulated with spread lips .
  has two allophones:
 Normally, it is a voiceless post-velar fricative with a simultaneous voiceless uvular trill  (hereafter written with a plain ), much like Northern Dutch  in the word   'yellow'.
 After front vowels (such as ), it is realized as a voiceless post-palatal fricative  (hereafter represented without the diacritic), similar to the German , but slightly more back. This consonant also occurs as an allophone of the initial sequence , so that   'huge' may be pronounced .
  is normally an approximant . After , it is realized as a tap . This is also the case in the sequence  (where  stands for any of ), as in   'clumsy'. Elsewhere in the article, this allophone is written with a plain .
  is clear . The velarized  found in the syllable coda in RP (and also in other positions in Scotland and the United States) does not exist in Glenoe.

Vowels

 Vowel length is governed by the Scottish vowel length rule and is therefore non-phonemic.  and the unstressed-only  are always short, whereas  are normally long but can be shortened due to the SVLR.
  are slightly lower than the corresponding cardinal vowels, but the difference is not very big.
 , a phonologically central vowel, is further front and more open than cardinal : .
The long allophone is almost fully close , but the short allophone is somewhat lower: .
  is more strongly rounded and closer than the cardinal : . It is similar in quality to Swedish and Norwegian .
An example of that is   'have to' (cf. 'have'). 'Polish'). Its phonetic quality is similar to that of  but more front. It is close to the  vowel in RP.
  is close-mid .
  are near-back .
  is near-open near-front . It corresponds to English , which in most English dialects is much closer . However, a similar sound of an  quality is used by some speakers of Ulster English.
  is near-back: , much like RP .

References

Bibliography

 
 

Scots dialects